Elk Hills-Buttonwillow Airport  is a public airport located three miles (5 km) south of the central business district (CBD) of Buttonwillow, in Kern County, California, United States. It is mostly used for general aviation.

Facilities 

 Runway 11/29: 3,260 x 50 ft (994 x 15 m), surface: asphalt

See also
 List of airports in Kern County, California

References

External links 

Airports in Kern County, California